Paralissotes reticulatus, also called the New Zealand reticulate stag beetle, is a native species of stag beetle from New Zealand. Although they do have wings they are flightless.

Taxonomy

This species was first described by John O. Westwood in 1844 under the name Lucanus reticulatus. It was placed in the Paralissotes genus in 1995.

Description

Including mandibles, male beetles have a length of 12.7-21.8 mm; female beetles from 13.8 to 21.3 mm. The beetle ranges from small to medium-sized with a glossy black exoskeleton. The reticulate name has its origin in the reticulate pattern of depressed scaly areas and non-scaly areas. Its head is widest in front of the eyes. Male and female beetles have similar sized mandibles. Like other Paralissotes species, this beetle is flightless despite having vestigial wings.

Distribution

Paralissotes reticulatus is the most widespread species in its genus, having been collected from the Bay of Plenty to South Canterbury. There have been recent collections of this species near Dunedin. It is found from near sea level to an altitude of about 950m.

Ecology
Like other stag beetles, adult Paralissotes reticulatus has been collected from underneath the decaying logs of native trees. The larvae are found inside rotting wood in an advanced state of decay. Like other Paralissotes species, this beetle is mostly seen at night, but may be seen during the day during wet conditions.

References 

Lucaninae
Beetles of New Zealand
Beetles described in 1844
Endemic fauna of New Zealand
Endemic insects of New Zealand